Grocer's itch is a cutaneous condition characterized by a pruritic dermatitis that occurs from coming into contact with mites such as Carpoglyphus passularum (a fruit mite) or Glycyphagus domesticus (a common house mite). Contact usually occurs when handling food with mites in it, such as figs, dates, prunes, grain, cheese, or other dried foods.

See also 
 Grain itch
 Gamasoidosis
 List of mites associated with cutaneous reactions

References 

Parasitic infestations, stings, and bites of the skin